Michael Shalhoub may refer to:

 Michael Shalhoub (actor), American actor, brother of actor Tony Shalhoub
 Michael Demitri Shalhoub, birth name of Egyptian actor Omar Sharif